Miaenia maritima is a species of beetle in the family Cerambycidae. It was described by Tsherepanov in 1979.

References

Miaenia
Beetles described in 1979